The Meiti Riverside Park is a waterfront park along the Keelung River in Zhongshan District, Taipei, Taiwan.

Geography
The park spans over an area of 45.62 hectares which includes 4,608 m2 area of cosmos plants. It houses the Meiti Pier for transportation along Keelung River.

Transportation
The park is accessible within walking distance south west from Xihu Station of Taipei Metro.

See also
 List of parks in Taiwan

References

External link

Parks in Taipei